Rose is a novel by Martin Cruz Smith published in 1996.  The story is set in 1872 Wigan, Lancashire, England, a district with extensive coal mines.

Synopsis
Jonathan Blair, a mining engineer, returns from Africa's Gold Coast and, on finding his native England utterly depressing, falls into melancholy and alcoholism. Blair wishes desperately to return to Africa, so, in exchange, he agrees to investigate the disappearance of a local curate engaged to marry the daughter of Blair's patron. With the unexpected assistance of Rose, a Wigan 'pit brow girl', Blair solves the mystery and, in the process, finds himself as well.

Analysis
As a human being as well as an (ad hoc) investigator, Jonathan Blair does bear more than a passing resemblance to the Russian Chief Investigator found in the sprawling series of seven "Arkady Renko" novels also penned by Martin Cruz Smith. He stubbornly avoids taking the easy way out and repeatedly risks life and limb in the process.

Translations
The book has been translated into Spanish, Dutch, Portuguese, French, German, Greek, Polish, Russian, and Hebrew.

Reviews
"Rose, a richly textured Victorian thriller from Martin Cruz Smith" by Martin Cruz Smith in Time. 147, no. 23, (1996): 73,
Review by E. Weber, NEW YORK TIMES BOOK REVIEW, 101, no. 24, (1996): 50
Review by David Horspool in TLS, the Times literary supplement. no. 4861, (1996): 22

References

External links
 Working in a coal mine - The bestselling author of Gorky Park finds literary gold in a notorious English mining town interview from Salon.com

Novels by Martin Cruz Smith
1996 American novels
Native American novels
Random House books
Novels set in Lancashire
Wigan
Novels set in England